Maksims Uvarenko (born 17 January 1987 in Ventspils) is a Latvian football goalkeeper.

Career
Uvarenko signed a contract with Slovan Liberec in January 2006. He made his debut the following year. Being a bright talent in Latvia, he played for many Latvian national youth teams.

It was difficult for him to find a place in the starting line-up, since he joined the team, so he signed a contract with the Czech 2. Liga club Vysočina Jihlava in February 2010, hoping to become the first choice keeper there.

In 2012, Uvarenko joined his former club FK Ventspils in the Latvian Higher League.

On 13 January 2015, Uvarenko signed with CSKA Sofia in Bulgaria on a one-and-a-half-year deal. He kept a clean sheet in his official debut for the "redmen" on 21 March 2015 – a 0:0 home draw with Beroe.

National team
Uvarenko played for the Latvian U-17 in 2003.

References 

1987 births
Living people
Latvian footballers
Latvia youth international footballers
Latvian expatriate footballers
Expatriate footballers in the Czech Republic
Latvian expatriate sportspeople in the Czech Republic
Expatriate footballers in Bulgaria
Latvian expatriate sportspeople in Bulgaria
Expatriate footballers in Slovakia
Latvian expatriate sportspeople in Slovakia
Expatriate footballers in Norway
Latvian expatriate sportspeople in Norway
Association football goalkeepers
FC Slovan Liberec players
MFK Vítkovice players
FC Vysočina Jihlava players
FK Ventspils players
PFC CSKA Sofia players
FC ViOn Zlaté Moravce players
Czech First League players
First Professional Football League (Bulgaria) players
People from Ventspils
Latvian people of Ukrainian descent
Levanger FK players